Eucalyptus clivicola, commonly known as green mallet, is a species of eucalypt that is endemic to Western Australia. It has smooth bark, linear to lance-shaped adult leaves, flower buds in groups of between nine and thirteen, pale yellow flowers and barrel-shaped, conical or cylindrical fruit.

Description
It has smooth grey over yellowish bark with flakes of rough, greyish bark that has not been completely shed. Flowering occurs from December to May and the flowers are pale yellow.

Taxonomy and naming
Eucalyptus clivicola was first formally described in 1991 by Ian Brooker and Stephen Hopper from a specimen on the Ravensthorpe - Hopetoun road and the description was publish in the journal Nuytsia. The specific epithet (clivicola) is derived from the Latin word clivus meaning "ascent", "elevation", "hill" or "sloping hillside" with the suffix -cola meaning "dweller", referring to the usual habitat of this species.

Distribution and habitat
Green mallet often grows in pure stands of open forest on breakaways, rarely on flat ground. It occurs between Ongerup, Ravensthorpe and Lake Magenta in the Esperance Plains and Mallee biogeographic regions.

Conservation status
This eucalypt is classified as "not threatened" by the Western Australian Government Department of Parks and Wildlife.

See also
List of Eucalyptus species

References

clivicola
Endemic flora of Western Australia
Mallees (habit)
Myrtales of Australia
Eucalypts of Western Australia
Goldfields-Esperance
Great Southern (Western Australia)
Taxa named by Ian Brooker
Taxa named by Stephen Hopper
Plants described in 1991